Bálint or Balint is a Hungarian surname derived from Valentinus.

Surname
Alice Balint (born Alice Székely-Kovács) (1898–1939), Hungarian psychoanalyst
András Bálint (born 1943), Hungarian actor
Dorel Balint (born 1969), Romanian footballer 
Endre Bálint (1914–1986), Hungarian painter and graphic artist
Eszter Balint, Hungarian singer, songwriter, violinist, and actress
Gabi Balint (born 1963), Romanian football manager and former player
 György Bálint (originally surname Braun; 1919–2020), Hungarian horticulturist, Candidate of Agricultural Sciences, journalist, author, and politician who served as an MP.
Lajos Bálint (1929–2010), Romanian archbishop
László Balint (born 1979), Romanian football manager and former player of Hungarian descent
László Bálint (born 1948), Hungarian former football player
Michael Balint (1896–1970), Hungarian psychoanalyst
Rezső Bálint (1874–1929), Austro-Hungarian neurologist and psychiatrist
Rezső Bálint (1885–1945), Hungarian painter
Becca Balint (born 1968), American politician

Given name
Bálint Bajner (born 1990), Hungarian football player
Bálint Bakfark (1507–1576), Hungarian and Polish composer of Transylvanian Saxon origin
Bálint Balassi (1554–1594), Hungarian poet
Bálint Hóman (1885–1951), Hungarian politician
Balint Karosi (born 1979), Hungarian organist and composer
Balint Miklos (born 1981), Romanian figure skater
Bálint Magosi (born 1989), Hungarian professional ice hockey forward
Bálint Magyar (born 1952), Hungarian politician
Bálint Török (1502–1551), Hungarian aristocrat
Balint Vazsonyi (1936–2003), Hungarian pianist
Bálint Vécsei (born 1993), Hungarian football player
Bálint Virág (born 1973), Hungarian mathematician

See also 
Balinț

References

Hungarian-language surnames
Hungarian masculine given names